The Left Democratic Front (LDF) also known as Left Front (Kerala) is an alliance of Centre-left to left-wing political parties in the state of Kerala, India. It is the current ruling political alliance of Kerala, since 2016. It is one of the two major political alliances in Kerala, the other being Indian National Congress-led United Democratic Front.

Seat Sharing Arrangement

Candidates

References

Notes

Lists of Indian political candidates
Indian general elections in Kerala